The 90th Massachusetts General Court, consisting of the Massachusetts Senate and the Massachusetts House of Representatives, met in 1869 during the governorship of Republican William Claflin. George O. Brastow and Robert Carter Pitman served as presidents of the Senate and Harvey Jewell served as speaker of the House.

Notable events include the creation of a Joint Special Committee on Woman Suffrage.

Senators

Representatives

See also
 41st United States Congress
 List of Massachusetts General Courts

References

Further reading
  (includes description of legislature)

External links
 
 

Political history of Massachusetts
Massachusetts legislative sessions
massachusetts
1869 in Massachusetts